Ain't No Saint is a career-spanning retrospective of folk musician John Martyn, released on the eve of the singer's 60th birthday in 2008.

The four-CD compilation album was compiled by John Hillarby, and is divided into two 'studio' discs and two 'live' discs. Hillarby selected at least one song from each of Martyn's 22 albums, along with rarities and outtakes, and added over 30 unreleased pieces.

Track listing
 "Fairy Tale Lullaby"	(John Martyn) – 2:51
 "Sing a Song of Summer" (Martyn) – 2:19
 "Stormbringer" (Martyn) – 4:17
 "Tree Green" (Martyn) – 3:10
 "Head and Heart" (Martyn) – 4:52
 "In the Evening" (Martyn) – 4:06
 "Solid Air"  (Martyn) – 5:47
 "Keep On" (Martyn) – 4:58
 "The Glory of Love"  (Billy Hill, Martyn) – 2:16
 "Go Down Easy" (Martyn) – 3:37
 "Ain't No Saint" [instrumental] (Martyn) – 5:55
 "Fine Lines" (Martyn) – 3:49
 "Eight More Miles" (Martyn) – 2:03
 "Call Me Crazy" (Martyn) – 7:26
 "Black Man at Your Shoulder" (Martyn) – 7:22
 "All for the Love of You" (Martyn) – 5:05
 "Working It Out" (Martyn) – 2:44
 "Couldn't Love You More" (Martyn) – 3:05
 "Advertisement" (Martyn) – 0:34
 "Small Hours" [instrumental] 	Martyn 	10:20
 "Anna" (Martyn) – 4:13
 "Lookin' On" (Martyn) – 5:16
 "Amsterdam" (Martyn) – 5:29
 "Hung Up" (Martyn) – 4:00
 "Acid Rain" (Martyn, Alan Thomson) – 4:12
 "Who Believes in Angels" (Martyn) – 4:57
 "The Apprentice" (Martyn) – 4:22
 "Hole in the Rain" (Martyn) – 4:40
 "One World" (Martyn) – 6:27
 "Sunday's Child" (Martyn) – 6:12
 "Carmine" (Martyn) – 5:29
 "The Sky Is Crying" (Elmore James, Clarence L. Lewis, Morgan Robinson) – 4:01
 "So Sweet" (Martyn) –	4:50
 "Back to Marseilles" (Martyn) – 4:20
 "Bless the Weather" [live] (Martyn) – 11:49
 "Make No Mistake" [live] (Martyn) – 5:16
 "So Much in Love with You" [live/#] 	Martyn 	5:55
 "Spencer the Rover" [live] (Martyn, Traditional) – 4:07
 "My Baby Girl" [live] (Martyn) – 2:48
 "You Can Discover" [live] (Martyn) – 5:15
 "Solid Air" [live] (Martyn) – 7:00
 "I'd Rather Be the Devil (Devil Got My Woman)" [live] (James) – 8:55
 "Outside In" [live] (Martyn) – 13:09
 "Advertisement" [live] (Martyn) – 0:17
 "Big Muff" [live] (Martyn) – 9:32
 "One Day Without You" [live] (Martyn) – 3:27
 "Dealer" [live] (Martyn) – 7:14
 "Smiling Stranger" [live] (Martyn) – 7:44
 "Johnny Too Bad" [live] (Hylton Beckford, Derrick Leapold Crooks, Shadow Wilson, Delroy Wilson) – 3:56
 "Hurt in Your Heart" [live] (Martyn) – 6:49
 "John Wayne" [live] (Martyn) – 6:37
 "Angeline" [live] (Martyn) – 5:21
 "Mad Dog Days" [live] (Martyn) – 5:12
 "The Moment" [live] (Martyn) – 4:16
 "Fisherman's Dream" [live] (Martyn) – 5:06
 "Sweet Little Mystery" [live] (Martyn) – 5:55
 "May You Never" [live]" (Martyn) – 5:37
 "Step It Up" [live]" (Martyn) – 3:47
 "Sunshine's Better" [live] (Martyn) – 5:05
 "One for the Road" (Martyn) – 3:28
 "Over the Hill" [live] (Martyn) – 3:27

Personnel
 Arran Ahmun – drums
 Spencer Cozens – piano
 John Paul "J.P." Jones – mandolin
 John Martyn – guitar
 Alan Thomson – bass
 Martin Winning – saxophone

Production
 Joe Black – project coordinator
 Paschal Byrne – mastering
 Daryl Easlea – liner notes, sleeve notes
 John Hillarby – liner notes, compilation, tape research
 Kenny Mathieson – photography
 Barry Plummer – photography
 Phil Smee – design
 Shamil Tanna – cover photo

References

External links
The John Martyn Website

John Martyn albums
2008 compilation albums
Island Records compilation albums